Andreas Behrend (born 27 September 1963) is a German swimmer. He competed in three events at the 1984 Summer Olympics for West Germany.

References

External links
 

1963 births
German male swimmers
Living people
Olympic swimmers of West Germany
Swimmers at the 1984 Summer Olympics
Swimmers from Berlin